Edmilson dos Santos Silva, or simply Edmilson (born 15 September 1982), is a Brazilian football forward who currently plays for Sport Recife.

Club career
Edmilson started his career playing for the Palmeiras. In January 2004, he joined J1 League side Albirex Niigata on loan from Palmeiras. He had a short loan spell at Niigata, and signed a permanent deal next year. He played for the club, scoring 62 league goals in four seasons as a regular player.

Edmilson moved to J1 League rival Urawa Red Diamonds in January 2008. He continued his successful career with Urawa, scoring 11 goals in 31 appearances. He ended up the second highest scorer in the league for the 2009 season with 17 goals.

On 29 June 2011, Urawa announced that Edmilson would leave Japan to join Qatari club Al-Gharafa.

On 25 April 2015, Edmílson joined Chapecoense.

Career statistics

Club
As of 29 June 2011

1Includes Emperor's Cup.
2Includes J.League Cup.
3Includes AFC Champions League.

Honours
Palmeiras
 Campeonato Brasileiro Série B: 2003

References

External links
Edmílson at playmakerstats.com (English version of ogol.com.br)

1982 births
Living people
Sportspeople from Salvador, Bahia
Brazilian footballers
Association football forwards
Campeonato Brasileiro Série A players
Sociedade Esportiva Palmeiras players
CR Vasco da Gama players
Red Bull Brasil players
Associação Chapecoense de Futebol players
J1 League players
J2 League players
Albirex Niigata players
Urawa Red Diamonds players
FC Tokyo players
Cerezo Osaka players
Al-Gharafa SC players
Sport Club do Recife players
Brazilian expatriate footballers
Brazilian expatriate sportspeople in Japan
Expatriate footballers in Japan
Brazilian expatriate sportspeople in Qatar
Expatriate footballers in Qatar
Qatar Stars League players